Eorhincodon is an invalid genus of requiem shark from the Late Eocene of Xinjiang, China, originally described as a whale shark. It is currently considered a junior synonym of Rhizoprionodon. The genus was originally erected by Li (1997) to include the species Eorhincodon tianshanensis, but Nessov (1999) used the preoccupied genus in a different paleontological context to include an unrelated species, E. casei, from Late Cretaceous Russian marine strata. A new genus, Pseudomegachasma, was erected in 2015 for E. casei to be transferred into.

References

Carcharhinidae
Eocene sharks
Fossil taxa described in 1997
Eocene fish of Asia